Good Bread Alley is the third studio album of Carl Hancock Rux. Titled after a close-knit historically African American district of shotgun houses that once occupied a segregated neighborhood in Miami, Florida, the cd was released by Thirsty Ear Music, produced by Carl Hancock Rux with songwriting and co-songwriting credits from Geoff Barrow, Vinicius Cantuária, David Holmes, Rob Hyman, Stewart Lerman, Darren Morris, Phil Mossman, Vernon Reid, Tim Saul, Jaco Van Schalkwyk, and Bill Withers.  The cd tackles religion, sexual politics, war and media overload, in the tradition of Marvin Gaye and Donny Hathaway, employing supersaturated, open-ended soul music  with bluesy vamps, touches of minimalism, and slide-guitar licks providing a rich backdrop for Rux's  sardonic baritone, achieving  a pop-gospel synthesis.

Track listing

 "Good Bread Alley" 5:47
 "My Brother's Hands" 5:13
 "Thadius Star" 5:09
 "Behind the Curtain" 4:55
 "Lies" 3:31
 "Geneva" 3:27
 "Black of My Shadow" 4:35
 "All the Rock Stars" 4:13
 "Living Room"	3:53	
 "I Can't Write Left Handed" 7:25
 "Better Left Unsaid (Complete Lost Session Tapes)" 5:20

Personnel
Carl Hancock Rux (lead and background vocals, programming)
Kwame Brandt Pierce (piano, keyboards, harpsichord) 
Brian Charette (keyboard) 
Rob Hyman (keyboard) 
Jason DeMatteo (acoustic bass) 
Fred Cash (electric bass) 
Stewart Lerman (electric bass) 
Chris Eddleton (percussion)
Sammy Merendino (drums) 
Dave Tronzo (slide guitar) 
Vinicius Cantuaria (acoustic guitar)
Leroy Jenkins (violin)
Jaco van Schalkwyk (samples, noise programming) 
Marcelle Lashley (featured and background vocals)
Helga Davis: (featured and background vocals)
Christalyn Wright (background vocals)
Stephanie Battle (background vocals)
Dave Darlington (Engineer) 
Michael Stryder (Photography)
Lorraine Walsh (Art Direction)

Critical reception
"Carl Hancock Rux declaims vivid texts in a half-spoken, half-sung baritone somewhere between Scott Walker and Gil Scott Heron. The musical settings shoot off in half a dozen different musical directions, depending on the inclinations of his collaborator, or the sample or loop used as the germ of each idea. Rux works in the manner of a rapper but the result is somehow fresher than much rap, and less self-regarding. Lies, co-written with Vernon Reid, uses a vocal harmony hook reminiscent of Moby or Alan Wilder's Recoil, while Black of My Shadow marries the instantly recognisable acoustic guitar chords of Vinicius Cantuaria to Helga Davis's soaring spirituals. My Brother's Hands is oddly reminiscent of Virginia Astley or the Blue Nile. Rux also delivers a moving reinvention of Bill Withers' I Can't Write Left Handed. The most focused piece is the title track, where a majestic, dirty blues vamp underscores another heartfelt soliloquy: "Our religiosity has got to be more/ Than historical animosity."
THE GUARDIAN

"For most poets-who-sing or singers-who-poet, the blues is a shirt to be worn instead of a whole wardrobe. But Rux is rooted in the blues, both musically and philosophically. “Geneva” features Dave Tronzo’s slinky slide guitar and Marcelle Lashey’s heroic testifying, both of which play perfectly against Rux’ tale of a hairdresser who somehow seems like the legendary Greek heroine Atalanta. Even during the Eno/Fripp/Bowie atmospheric cloud of “My Brother’s Hands (Union Song)”, collaborator Jaco van Schalkwyk starts to add congas and backup layers until everything simmers, and then Rux pours his vocabulary all over everything like gravy. Rux is the least pretentious of pretentious poets—he even has the courtesy to introduce the protest song “I Can’t Write Left-Handed” with a brief spoken intro giving props to composer Bill Withers, right before he sings the holy living shit out of the song. Just listening to it makes my eyes fill up, especially since it seems like this god damned war in Iraq is never going to end. Carl Hancock Rux is out there, making things weird and lovely and furious and deep. If it might not be your cup of tea, maybe you need to drink something besides tea for a change."
POPMATTERS

"Carl Hancock Rux tackles religion, sexual politics, war and media overload, which places him squarely in the tradition of Marvin Gaye and Donny Hathaway. Like Gaye and Hathaway, Rux creates supersaturated, open-ended soul music that can tend toward the programmatic, with bluesy vamps, touches of minimalism, and slide-guitar licks providing a rich backdrop for his sardonic baritone. On Behind The Curtain, Rux achieves a pop-gospel synthesis that recalls the work of Loves Arthur Lee. Black Of The Shadow features Brazilian guitarist Vinicius Cantuaria, while All The Rock Stars is a series of funk grooves that add up to an ingeniously dovetailed mutant samba. Rux sings with a sense of outrage, delivered with real passion."
NO DEPRESSION

"Working with a smaller set of musicians -- and for a smaller label -- the multi-disciplinary artist Carl Hancock Rux delivers what is arguably his most musical album to date. There are more "songs" on Good Bread Alley than on the poet/author/vocalist's previous efforts, and Rux also uses his deep baritone singing voice more than usual. Hip-hop and electronica make brief appearances, but most of the sounds here are neo-cabaret, neo-classical, or downtown loft blues, played naked and live enough to suggest what a one-man show from Rux might sound like. On the opening title track, Rux drags behind him the faux synthesized orchestra that appears throughout the album. Decidedly fake horns and strings plod out the tune, denying their leader's Gil Scott-Heron-styled tale of "why didn't we see it coming" which fades in and out like a radio station on the edge of reception. From here, Good Bread Alley becomes more approachable, more warm, less produced, but no less evocative. The tales of "wine and war" mentioned on "Thadius Star"—a song originally written for former Brooklyn Funk Essentials member Stephanie McKay's solo debut—contrast wealth and poverty, success and failure, hope and disappointment. Rux has a firm grip on his art but he's humbled by the complexity of modern life and doesn't offer answers as much as advocate awareness. He recites his prose if need be, but more often sings his message with the earthy tone that has earned him the experimental blues tag he's been pigeonholed with. The desolate "Thadius Star" adds Brecht and Weill to the jumble of influences, along with Massive Attack, whose spirit is deep in the song's sensual slinking. "Black of My Shadow" puts spirituals and Billie Holiday through William S. Burroughs' cut-up treatment, while the taut "Living Room" unleashes the old-fashioned, straight-ahead R&B, although the "Soul fury!" shouted out in the song speaks to domestic violence instead of Stax. There's also an incredible, heartbreaking cover of Bill Withers' protest song "I Can't Write Left Handed" here to prove Rux is also a gripping performer and interpreter. Still, with all the advancement he has made as a musician, his spellbinding words still offer the richest rewards and are the most responsible element in making Good Bread Alley the potent triumph it is." 
ALL MUSIC

"Magnificent rhythm can grab you every time. If the rhythm in this recording doesn’t penetrate your soul and you can’t hear the message, I would say that something is seriously lacking in your sensibilities. The character of this recording is basic. It begs to reach into the very recesses of your connections with human instinct. The seductive lure of Rux’s voice is clear. Entangle his vocalization with parallel forces of the music and the result is one hell of a statement.The decorative vehicle of the mixing does its job. The mixing supplies a programmatic layer to the words and buttresses their impact. The lyric metamorphoses nearly into opera. Each song reveals another avenue in the story. The story? About truth, justice and the American way? No, it is larger than that. The story is concerned with what to believe in at all given the constant confrontations that equal daily life for the African-American, the artist, the downtrodden, the disabled, the poor.... the minor players. Of course, the questions are raised about the direction in which anyone can go and once the direction is found can anyone be recognized for talent, giftedness, artfulness, beauty and, most significantly, mere humanness.The edge dividing the body and the soul and mind defies definition. How many times has art addressed this edge and from the addressing culture evolves. Carl Hancock Rux has worked with a stellar team to stretch and magnify electronic, blues, rap, classical, gospel, rock and jazz ethics into a peculiarly exuberant sound portrait of his compositions. His compositions walk the edge, going forward without teetering. Ain’t no mistaking Good Bread Alley for some pretentious effort to aggravate wrath at the status of the ever-present divisions between art and life. Rather Good Bread Alley gets you going and makes you pay attention, one more time. You are strangely liberated."
JAZZ REVIEW

References 

2006 albums
Carl Hancock Rux albums